Munkelia is the second last station on Lambertseter Line of the Oslo Metro, between Lambertseter and Bergkrystallen,  from Stortinget. The station is served by Lines 1 and 4. The station is located just north of the entrance of one of the few tunnels on this subway line. The entrance to the two platforms is to the south.

The station was opened 22 May 1966. Guttorm Bruskeland was the architect .

References

External links

Oslo Metro stations in Oslo
Railway stations opened in 1957
1957 establishments in Norway
Lambertseter